Composite methods are an approach applied in structural dynamics and related fields. They combine various methods in each time step, in order to acquire the advantages of different methods. The existing composite methods show satisfactory accuracy and powerful numerical dissipation, which is particularly useful for solving stiff problems and differential-algebraic equations.

Definitions 

After spatial discretization, structural dynamics problems are generally described by the second-order ordinary differential equation:

.

.

Taking the step 

Although there are lots of available methods, see the review, the existing composite methods basically employ the combination of the trapezoidal rule and linear multistep methods. However, to acquire at least second-order accuracy and unconditional stability, the scalar parameters of each method and the division of sub-steps need to be determined carefully.

Two examples of composite method

Two-sub-step Bathe method 

The Bathe method  is a two-sub-step method. In the first sub-step , the trapezoidal rule is used as:

In the second sub-step , the 3-point Euler backward method is employed as

The Bathe method is second-order accurate and unconditionally stable from linear analysis. Besides, this method can provide strong numerical dissipation for high-frequency content, which is helpful to damp out the stiff components and enhance the stability for nonlinear dynamics.

On this basis, to acquire prescribed degree of numerical dissipation, the -Bathe method  was developed by replacing the 3-point Euler backward method in the second sub-step with a general formula:

The parameters are selected as recommended

With the set of parameters, the -Bathe method can also achieve second-order accuracy and unconditional stability. Moreover, by adjusting the parameter , this method can provide tunable degree of numerical dissipation. The method with a smaller  shows stronger numerical dissipation, but lower accuracy in the low-frequency content.

Three-sub-step composite method 

Following the idea of the Bathe method, the three-sub-step composite methods that use the trapezoidal rule in the first two sub-steps were also discussed. In the first two sub-steps, the trapezoidal rule is used, as

and

In the last sub-step, a general formula is utilized as

For this method, Li et al. offered two optimal set of parameters, as

The resulting two sub-families are all second-order accurate, unconditionally stable, and can provide tunable numerical dissipation by adjusting . They become the same when . When , the sub-family with  shows better amplitude and period accuracy than the -Bathe method under the same computational costs, and the sub-family with  further improves the period accuracy at the cost of lower amplitude accuracy.

Analysis 

In structural dynamics, the test model for property analysis is the single degree-of-freedom homogeneous equation, as

Applying the composite method to the test model yields the compact scheme

Generally,  has one zero characteristic root and a pair of conjugate complex roots , which can be solved from

Accuracy 

From the compact scheme, the difference equation only with respect to the displacement can be written as

The local truncation error  is defined as

The method is called th-order accurate if .

Stability 

For physically stable systems, the method can give stable solutions if the spectral radius . A method is called unconditionally stable if the condition  is satisfied for any 
, otherwise it is called conditionally stable. The spectral radius at the high-frequency limit, i.e.

Amplitude decay ratio and period elongation ratio 

In addition to the accuracy order, the amplitude decay ratio and period elongation ratio are also usually evaluated to measure the amplitude and period accuracy in the low-frequency content. The exact solution of the test model is

The numerical solution can be also expressed as a similar form, as

The damping ratio  and frequency  can be obtained from the norm  and phase , as

Example 

Consider the Bathe method,  and  have the form as

Here the undamped case, i.e. , is considered for simplicity. One can check that this method can satisfy the conditions of second-order accuracy and unconditional stability.

See also
 Runge-Kutta method
 List of Runge–Kutta methods
 Numerical ordinary differential equations
 Linear multistep method
 Lie group integrator

References 

Numerical analysis
Numerical differential equations